Jeffery Dean Struecker (March 7, 1969) is an American author, pastor, and former United States Army Ranger who was involved in the Battle of Mogadishu in 1993. He also participated in the 1989 invasion of Panama (Operation Just Cause) and in Kuwait during Operation Desert Storm. Struecker has co-authored five published books. Struecker was portrayed by American actor Brian Van Holt in the 2001 film, Black Hawk Down, and in 2017, he was inducted into the Army Ranger Hall of Fame.

Enlisted service

Enlisted in the United States Army in September 1987 at the age of 18, Struecker served ten years in the 75th Ranger Regiment in positions ranging from Ranger Reconnaissance specialist to platoon sergeant. He would go on to win the Best Ranger Competition in 1996 with partner SPC Isaac Gmazel.

Struecker was also recognized in 1998 with the United States Army Reserve Officers' Training Corps (ROTC) Noncommissioned Officer of the Year.

Battle of Mogadishu
In the 1993 Battle of Mogadishu, Struecker was a 24-year-old sergeant and squad leader assigned to Task Force Ranger as a part of the 75th Ranger Regiment. He led the 3-vehicle convoy that returned, through intense fire, wounded Ranger Private Todd Blackburn to base.  Struecker was awarded the Silver Star for his actions in Mogadishu. 

In the film based on the battle, Black Hawk Down, Struecker is portrayed by Brian Van Holt.

Commissioned service
After his enlisted service ended in April 2000, Struecker went on to graduate from seminary and became commissioned as a chaplain. As chaplain, Struecker served multiple tours in Operation Enduring Freedom in Afghanistan and Operation Iraqi Freedom in Iraq. Struecker's final military assignment was chaplain with the Regimental Special Troops Battalion of the 75th Ranger Regiment. Struecker retired from active military service at the end of January 2011.

Awards and decorations
     

 
 
 

Struecker has also earned six Overseas Service Bars, 2nd Infantry Regiment DUI and Thai Parachutist Wings as well as other foreign wings and one unidentified fourragère.

Post-military career
Immediately following his retirement from the military, Struecker joined the staff of Calvary Baptist Church in Columbus, Georgia and became its lead pastor in April 2014 and resigned the position in May of 2019.  Struecker then founded 2 Cities Church in Columbus, Georgia, where he is currently the lead pastor. Struecker has also continued to author books and he speaks regularly to audiences across the United States about his experiences and about his Christian faith.

Return to Mogadishu
In March 2013 Struecker returned to Mogadishu with a film crew to shoot a short film Return to Mogadishu: Remembering Black Hawk Down which debuted in October 2013 on the 20th anniversary of the battle. Struecker and fellow veteran-turned-country singer Keni Thomas relived the battle as they drove through the Bakaara Market in armored vehicles and visited the Wolcott crash site.

Education and personal life
Struecker earned the Doctor of Philosophy from Southeastern Baptist Theological Seminary in Wake Forest, North Carolina, a Master of Divinity Degree from the Southern Baptist Theological Seminary in Louisville, Kentucky, and a Bachelor of Science Degree and Associate of Science Degree from Troy State University in Troy, Alabama.

He is married to his wife Dawn and has five children.

Published books
 The Road To Unafraid: How the Army's Top Ranger Faced Fear and Found Courage through Black Hawk Down and Beyond (2006) 
 Certain Jeopardy (2009) 
 Blaze of Glory: A Novel (2010) 
 Fallen Angel: A Novel (2011) 
 Hide and Seek: A Novel (2012) 
 Start Here (2021) ISBN  978-1736799109

References

External links

 Jeff Struecker's home page

1969 births
Living people
21st-century American novelists
American male novelists
American religious writers
Recipients of the Silver Star
United States Army personnel of the Gulf War
United States Army personnel of the Iraq War
United States Army personnel of the War in Afghanistan (2001–2021)
People from Fort Dodge, Iowa
People from Columbus, Georgia
Southern Baptist ministers
Battle of Mogadishu (1993)
United States Army chaplains
United States Army Rangers
Novelists from Iowa
Writers from Columbus, Georgia
Troy University alumni
Southern Baptist Theological Seminary alumni
21st-century American male writers
Novelists from Georgia (U.S. state)
21st-century American non-fiction writers
American male non-fiction writers